Si Rattana is a district (amphoe) in the central part of Sisaket province, northeastern Thailand.

Geography
Neighboring districts are (from the north clockwise): Phayu, Nam Kliang, Benchalak, Kantharalak, Khun Han and Phrai Bueng.

History
The minor district (king amphoe) was created on 5 March 1981, when the four tambons, Si Kaeo, Phing Phuai, Sa Yao, and Tum, were split off from Kantharalak district. It was upgraded to a full district on 26 May 1989.

Administration
The district is divided into seven sub-districts (tambons), which are further subdivided into 90 villages (mubans). Si Rattana is a sub-district municipality (thesaban tambon), which covers parts of tambons Si Kaeo and Saphung. There are a further seven tambon administrative organizations (TAO).

References

External links
amphoe.com (Thai)

Si Rattana